The Washington State Medical Association (WSMA) is a professional organization providing tangible support of medical practice and access to physician services; promoting quality, cost effective care; and being a respected voice in the public arena.

Mission
The WSMA is physician driven and patient focused, working to make Washington a better place to practice medicine and to receive care.

External links
Washington State Medical Association (WSMA)

Organizations based in Washington (state)
American Medical Association